Clement Mabothile Lebopo (born December 31, 1974) is a Lesotho marathon runner. At age thirty-three, Lebopo made his official debut for the 2008 Summer Olympics in Beijing, where he competed in the men's marathon, along with his compatriots Tsotang Maine and Moses Mosuhli. He did not finish the entire race, before reaching the 10 km lap of the course.

References

External links

NBC Olympics Profile

Lesotho male marathon runners
Living people
Olympic athletes of Lesotho
Athletes (track and field) at the 2008 Summer Olympics
1974 births